Popov is a rural locality (a khutor) in Olshanskoye Rural Settlement, Uryupinsky District, Volgograd Oblast, Russia. The population was 954 as of 2010. There are 19 streets.

Geography 
Popov is located in forest steppe, on the right bank of the Olshanka River, 6 km northeast of Uryupinsk (the district's administrative centre) by road. Olshanka is the nearest rural locality.

References 

Rural localities in Uryupinsky District